Sir George Barclay Bruce (1 October 1821 – 25 August 1908) was a British civil engineer.  Bruce was primarily a railway engineer who worked for many railway companies in Britain, Europe, Asia and South America.  He was closely involved with the Institution of Civil Engineers, serving at various times as a member, council member, vice-president and president.  He received a knighthood from the British Government and was made an officer of the Legion of Honour by the French in recognition of his services to construction.  Bruce was a Presbyterian and committed himself to spreading the church in England and to improve public education, to which end he gave his time and money generously.

Early life and career

Bruce was born in Newcastle upon Tyne to John Bruce, the founder of Percy Street Academy.  Amongst his father's pupils at the academy was Robert Stephenson, the railway engineer, to whom George was apprenticed for five years from 1836. He then spent two years working on the construction of the Newcastle and Darlington Railway followed by two further years as resident engineer on the Northampton and Peterborough line.  Robert Stephenson then appointed him to work on the Royal Border Bridge, after it opened in 1850 Bruce presented an account of his time there to the Institution of Civil Engineers for which he received a Telford Medal in 1851.  Following this Bruce was primarily concerned with the construction and maintenance of railways in India. He was engaged to the East Indian Railway and the Madras Railway until ill health ended his time in India in 1856.

Consultancy 

Upon his return to England Bruce established a consulting engineering practice in Westminster, in 1888 taking Robert White as a partner. Developing a considerable worldwide reputation for railway construction many of his works were undertaken abroad. In particular he continued his close relationship with the Indian railways, acting as a consultant to the South Indian Railway, Great Indian Peninsular Railway and the Indian Midland Railway. He also worked on several lines in present-day Germany and Russia amongst them the Tilsit-Insterburg (Kaliningrad Oblast) and Berlin-Görlitz lines (Brandenburg and Saxony).
Between 1873 and 1876 Bruce constructed a railway and pier at Huelva in Spain to aid the shipping of ore from the Rio Tinto copper mines for the newly formed Rio Tinto Group. Other works abroad included the East Argentine Railway and the Buenos Aires Grand National Tramway in Argentina and the Beira Railway in South Africa.

Closer to home Bruce worked with many British railway companies including works on the Stonehouse and Nailsworth; Peterborough, Wisbech and Sutton; Kettering, Thrapston and Huntingdon; and the Whitehaven, Cleator and Egremont railway lines. He was an advocate of the 5 ft 6 in rail gauge which was popular amongst the British colonies at the time.

Professional recognition 

Bruce became a member of the Institution of Civil Engineers in 1850, was elected a member of their council in 1871, vice president in 1883 and president between June 1887 and May 1889 the golden jubilee year of the institution. In recognition of his services to the profession he was knighted by Queen Victoria at Windsor Castle on 10 July 1888. In 1889 he was made an officer of the French Legion d'honneur.  He became a member of the Institution of Mechanical Engineers in 1874. A portrait of him by W. M. Palin was presented to the Institution of Civil Engineers by members in 1889 for their gallery of former presidents.

Personal life 

Bruce was committed to the cause of Presbyterianism in England and to the furtherance of public education.  He gave his money and time generously to promote the union of the various Presbyterian churches into a single Presbyterian Church of England which was created in 1876, he built a Presbyterian church and manse at Wark on Tyne using his own funds.  His efforts to improve public education were largely carried out by representing Marylebone as a member of the School Board for London between 1882 and 1885.

He married Helen Norah Simpson in 1847 by whom he had one son and four daughters.  Bruce died at his home in St. John's Wood, on 25 August 1908 and was buried in a family vault on the eastern side of Highgate Cemetery, situated almost opposite the grave of Karl Marx.

References

External links

        
        
        
        
        
        

English civil engineers
Knights Bachelor
Presidents of the Institution of Civil Engineers
Presidents of the Smeatonian Society of Civil Engineers
1821 births
1908 deaths
Burials at Highgate Cemetery
People from Newcastle upon Tyne
Members of the London School Board